The Jebel Akhdar is a heavily forested, fertile upland area in northeastern Libya.  It is located in the modern shabiyahs or districts of Derna, Jabal al Akhdar, and Marj.

Geography
It forms the north-western part of the peninsula that sticks north into the Mediterranean Sea, with the Gulf of Sidra on the west, and the Levantine Basin on the east. The final uplift and arching of the plateau was completed in the Miocene.

The region is one of the very few forested areas of Libya, which taken as a whole is one of the least forested countries on Earth. The high rainfall contributes to the area's large forests containing Chammari, and enables rich fruit, potato, and cereal agriculture, something of a rarity in an arid country like Libya. Camels, goats and sheep are herded in and around the Jebel Akhdar and the herders tend to be nomadic.

Flora

In marked contrast to the aridity prevailing in most of Libya, there are forested areas in this region totalling around 3200 km2, although approximately a third of the original forest has already been destroyed to make way for agriculture. In addition to the forests there are also large areas of maquis and steppe-like vegetation. Typical maquis species are the Phoenician juniper (Juniperus phoenicea), the mastic tree (Pistacia lentiscus), the Kermes oak (Quercus coccifera) and the carob tree (Ceratonia siliqua). In the drier steppe-like areas, branched asphodel (Asphodelus ramosus), prickly burnet (Sarcopoterium spinosum) and white wormwood (Artemisia herba-alba) predominate.
More than half of the endemic plant species in Libya are to be found in the Jebel Akhdar and, of these, seven are found only in the region: Arbutus pavarii, Arum cyrenaicum, Bellis sylvestris var. cyrenaica, Cyclamen rohlfsianum, Cynara cyrenaica, Onopordum cyrenaicum and Romulea cyrenaica.

History

Ancient

Documents created during the New Kingdom of Egypt record that to the west there were large populations of metal workers who lived in towns and had plentiful livestock. The only plausible location for these "Libyans" is the Jebel Akhdar.

The ancient Greek colony of Cyrene was located in a lush valley in the Jebel Akhdar, with the ruins remaining. It was the Greeks who introduced farming to the Jebal Akhdar when they colonised its verdant valleys in around 600 BC.

Italian occupation
During the Italian occupation these mountains were identified as a promising area for agriculture and many Italians moved here in the 1930s. This settlement was interrupted during World War II and the villages and farms were deserted and were later reoccupied by Libyans.  The mountain chain was the site of major battles between the British Commonwealth and the Axis forces during World War II.

Liberation
The Libyan leader Omar al-Mukhtar used this heavily forested mountainous region to resist the Italian colonization of Libya for more than twenty years.

Galleries

Landscapes

Flora

Fauna

See also

Mediterranean dry woodlands and steppe – lower elevations
Mediterranean woodlands and forests – higher elevations

References

Geographical areas
Natural regions of Africa
 
Mountains of Libya
Jabal al Akhdar
Derna District
Cyrenaica
Geography of Libya